Parseoni is a town and a tehsil in Ramtek subdivision of Nagpur district in Nagpur revenue Division in the Berar region in the state of Maharashtra, India.

It is located on the banks of Pench River.

Demographic
As per Indian government census 2011, the population was 1,43,019.

Culture

Climate

The main occupation in parseoni is Agriculture
Agriculture in parseoni tehsil mainly consist of cotton and rice in large quantity and Also wheat in small quantity.
Even though nagpur is famous for oranges this area is less producer of oranges
The agricultural land receives water from Pench dam and monsoon water

Pench Prakalp

Pench Dam on Pench river is biggest dam in Nagpur district after Totladoh dam both are in the north of the town known as Pench Project or Pench Prakalp. Water of the dam is use for irrigation  in large part of the Parseoni,  Kalmeshwar, Kamthi, Savner, Ramtek,  Mauda, Kuhi tehsil.

This dam also supply large part of drinking water to Nagpur city. Koradi and Khaparkheda power plant also getting water from  the dam and hence lot of time farmer face water shortage for irrigation in those year when rain fall is low...

River

Pench National Park

Admintration

Transportation

Education Facilities

Famous people from Parseoni
This is a categorized list of notable people who were born or have dwelt in Parseoni, India

 Ashwin Upase -  (CAPITALIST)

Dr Ashwin Tikaramji chinchkhde (MBBS,MD medicine)
born in middle class farmer family at karambhad village of parseoni taluka completed primary education from ZP school karambhad. Sarvodaya vidyalaya parseoni and 10 th class from LBS vidyalaya babulwada, Thereafter completed MBBS from Wardha and MD in Internal medicine from prestigios institute KEM hospital mumbai
currently practising at nagpur as specialist in critical care and medicine in nagpur

 DR Avinash Tikaramji chichkhede(MBBS, MD paediatric, child specialist)
Born and brought up in karmbhad village of parseoni taluka ,and sarvodaya vidyalaya and LBSV babulwada 
Thereafter completed MBBS from Wardha and MD in pediatric from Govt medicall college nagpur,shifted to United Kingdom(England)for higher education in nov 2022

Mr. Dipak Yashwantrao Kathane, (B.Com.,M.Com.)
Right now, working at High Court of Judicature at Bombay, Nagpur Bench, Nagpur.
Born in middle class farmer family at Mehandi village of Parseoni taluka completed primary education from ZP school Mehandi, Sarvodaya vidyalaya parseoni and Junior College completed from Harihar Junior College, Parseoni.
Graduaation Completed from S.N.T. College, Ramtek.
Thereafter completed Post Graduation in G.S. College, Nagpur.
Currently working at High Court of Judicature at Bombay, Nagpur Bench, Nagpur.

References

Cities and towns in Nagpur district
Talukas in Maharashtra